The 1923 Manx Amataeur Road Races a forerunner of the Manx Grand Prix were held on 20 September 1923.  The first winner was Les Randles riding a 500c Sunbeam motor-cycle.

During an early morning practice session, the Isle of Man competitor Ned Brew crashed fatally in an accident at the Hillbery Corner.

Results

1923 Manx Amateur Road Race
Thursday 20 September 1923 –  5 laps (188.75 miles) Isle of Man TT Mountain Course.

Sources

External links
 Detailed race results
 Mountain Course map

1923
Isle
1923 in the Isle of Man
1923 in British motorsport